Hanyani Masana Shimange (born 17 April 1978) is a former professional rugby union player. His position of choice was hooker, but he played one game for the Springboks at flank.

Club rugby
Born in  Elim, a small town in South Africa's Western Cape Province, Shimange started his rugby career at Western Province, being part of the Western Province Academy Team. In 1999 he was picked for the South Africa u/21 team who took part in the Southern Hemisphere u/21 competition. During the same year he made his debut in the Currie Cup for the Sharks. In 2002 he moved to Bloemfontein to play for the Free State Cheetahs, where he also played in the Vodacom Cup as well as the Currie Cup. As a representative of the Cheetahs he was picked for the Cats' Super Rugby team in 2003. Through 2003 and 2004 he played a total of 18 games for the Cats, often as a replacement, but failed to score any points. He was also on the bench for two more games, but did not take to the field.

Shimange played for the Free State Cheetahs and the Cats until 2004, before moving back to the Western Cape, to take up a contract with Western Province. He also played Currie Cup for Western Province until 2006. Shimange often found himself picked as a replacement and started few games. In 2007 he moved to Boland in the hope of getting more game-time. However he ended up playing for no South African domestic union in 2007, due to Boland laying him off in the wake of the Fidentia meltdown.

Shimange did however continue to be part of the Stormers' squad in the Super Rugby competition that year. He returned to Cape Town in 2008 where he started playing for Western Province in the Vodacom Cup, before playing Currie Cup rugby for them from 2009 until his retirement in 2010. In January 2010 Shimange trained with the Lions Super Rugby squad while being assessed by Lions' coach Dick Muir for a possible loan agreement with the Stormers to whom he was contracted. He did not end up playing for the Lions on loan and formed part of the Stormers squad for the 2010 Super Rugby season.

International rugby
On 26 June 2004, Shimange made his debut for the Springboks against Wales at Loftus Versfeld in Pretoria, coming on as a replacement in the second half, replacing Victor Matfield in the 62nd minute, and playing his only test at flank. South Africa won the game 53-18. All Shimange's international caps came as a replacement. He took the field a total of 9 times from the replacement bench, but was unused on the bench for another 12 tests. His final test for the Springboks was played on 10 June 2006 against Scotland at Kings Park in Durban. South Africa won the game 36-16. He was included on the bench in subsequent tests, but was never utilised again until he was dropped from the Springbok squad in May 2007 by coach Jake White.

Shimange was nominated for the SA Rugby Young Player of the Year award in 2002.

Test history

Retirement
After retirement, Shimange joined South African pay TV channel SuperSport's broadcasting team in 2011 as a rugby analyst.

In 2013, Shimange took over the coaching of the University of Cape Town's rugby team, the Ikey Tigers, for their Super League A campaign after the departure of their head coach Kevin Foote to the Western Force following the 2013 Varsity Cup season.

See also
List of South Africa national rugby union players – Springbok no. 761

References

External links
 

South Africa international rugby union players
1978 births
Living people
People from the Overberg District Municipality
Rugby union hookers
Boland Cavaliers players
Free State Cheetahs players
Lions (United Rugby Championship) players
Sharks (Currie Cup) players
Stormers players
Western Province (rugby union) players
Alumni of Rondebosch Boys' High School
Rugby union players from the Western Cape